Saint-Molf is a commune in the Loire-Atlantique department in western France.

See also
La Baule - Guérande Peninsula
Communes of the Loire-Atlantique department
Parc naturel régional de Brière

References

Saintmolf